Irene Ryder (born 1949) is a Eurasian Hong Kong English pop singer in Hong Kong during the 1960s.

Career 
In 1966, Ryder attained the unofficial title of Go Go Queen after winning a talent quest. Her first single was "To Sir With Love". Among the other singles that she recorded was "Baby Baby", a duet with Robert Lee, former member of Hong Kong beat band The Thunderbirds and the younger brother of martial arts star Bruce Lee.

In 1966, Ryder became an actress in Hong Kong film. She appeared in The Flying Killer, a 1966 fantasy action film directed by Chien Lung. Ryder's last film was Cuties Parade, as 1975 drama film directed by Pan Lei. Ryder is credited with five films.

In 1969, she was the only female singer chosen to represent Hong Kong at the 1970 World Expo in Osaka, Japan.

Discography

Singles
 Irene Ryder & Robert Lee – "Baby baby" / "You put me down" – EMI Columbia CHK-102

LPs
 Irene Ryder – EMI Regal SREG-9603 – 1971
 Irene – EMI Regal SREG-9611 – 1973
 Solitaire – EMI Columbia S-33ESX-220 – 1974
 The Best Of Irene Ryder – EMI Columbia S-33ESX-225 – 1975

Compilations
 Various Artists: Hit Sounds – "I Don't Know How To Love Him" (Andrew Lloyd Webber/Tim Rice) – Irene Ryder – EMI Regal SREG 9621 – 1975
 Various Artists: 16 Motion Picture Greats For You – (Where Do I Begin?) Love Story"  (Francis Lai/Carl Sigman) – Irene Ryder "Speak Softly Love (Love Theme from The Godfather)"  (Larry Kusik/Nino Rota) – Irene Ryder – EMI SPR 1001–1977
 Various Artists: Age of 70's EMI 100週年珍藏系列之《西洋風》 – "Help Me Make It Through the Night"  (Kris Kristofferson/Fred Foster) – Irene Ryder  "You're So Vain"  (Carly Simon)  – Irene Ryder  "All Over The World"  (Françoise Hardy) – Irene Ryder  "The Last Waltz"  (Barry Mason/Les Reed) – Irene Ryder – EMI 7-2438-21249-24 – 1997
 Various Artists: Uncle Ray's Choice – "Baby Baby" – Irene Ryder & Robert Lee (1968) – EMI – 2003

References

 《ACIDent》(The Pearl Report, TVB, 2010-03-07)

External links
 Learning from Irene's road to recovery
 Tragedy turns to triumph

20th-century Hong Kong women singers
English-language singers from Hong Kong
1949 births
Living people